South Monroe is an unincorporated community and census-designated place (CDP) in Monroe County in the U.S. state of Michigan.  The population was 6,468 at the 2020 census.  The CDP is located within Monroe Charter Township.

Geography

Major highways
 runs briefly along the southwestern boundary of the CDP.
 runs south–north through the center of the CDP.

Demographics

As of the census of 2000, there were 6,370 people, 2,605 households, and 1,740 families residing in the CDP. The racial makeup of the CDP was 92.68% White, 2.94% African American, 0.19% Native American, 1.18% Asian, 0.02% Pacific Islander, 1.16% from other races, and 1.84% from two or more races. Hispanic or Latino of any race were 2.42% of the population.

There were 2,605 households, out of which 31.5% had children under the age of 18 living with them, 49.6% were married couples living together, 13.8% had a female householder with no husband present, and 33.2% were non-families. 29.6% of all households were made up of individuals, and 14.9% had someone living alone who was 65 years of age or older.  The average household size was 2.40 and the average family size was 2.96.

In the CDP, the population was spread out, with 25.4% under the age of 18, 7.8% from 18 to 24, 27.6% from 25 to 44, 22.2% from 45 to 64, and 17.1% who were 65 years of age or older.  The median age was 38 years. For every 100 females, there were 85.0 males.  For every 100 females age 18 and over, there were 80.3 males.

The median income for a household in the CDP was $43,665, and the median income for a family was $54,042. Males had a median income of $46,286 versus $26,490 for females. The per capita income for the CDP was $23,490.  About 8.5% of families and 10.6% of the population were below the poverty line, including 15.1% of those under age 18 and 9.2% of those age 65 or over.

References

Unincorporated communities in Monroe County, Michigan
Census-designated places in Michigan
Unincorporated communities in Michigan
Census-designated places in Monroe County, Michigan